Evgeny Kudyakov (born 30 April 1985) is a Russian judoka.

Achievements

References

External links
 

1985 births
Living people
Russian male judoka
Universiade medalists in judo
Universiade silver medalists for Russia
Medalists at the 2009 Summer Universiade
Place of birth missing (living people)